A metered-dose inhaler (MDI) is a device that delivers a specific amount of medication to the lungs, in the form of a short burst of aerosolized medicine that is usually self-administered by the patient via inhalation. It is the most commonly used delivery system for treating asthma, chronic obstructive pulmonary disease (COPD) and other respiratory diseases. The medication in a metered dose inhaler is most commonly a bronchodilator, corticosteroid or a combination of both for the treatment of asthma and COPD. Other medications less commonly used but also administered by MDI are mast cell stabilizers, such as cromoglicate or nedocromil.

Description 

A metered-dose inhaler consists of three major components; the canister which is produced in aluminium or stainless steel by means of deep drawing, where the formulation resides; the metering valve, which allows a metered quantity of the formulation to be dispensed with each actuation; and an actuator (or mouthpiece) which allows the patient to operate the device and directs the aerosol into the patient's lungs., The formulation itself is made up of the drug, a liquefied gas propellant and, in many cases, stabilising excipients. The actuator contains the mating discharge nozzle and generally includes a dust cap to prevent contamination.

To use the inhaler the patient presses down on the top of the canister, with their thumb supporting the lower portion of the actuator. Actuation of the device releases a single metered dose of the formulation which contains the medication either dissolved or suspended in the propellant. Breakup of the volatile propellant into droplets, followed by rapid evaporation of these droplets, results in the generation of an aerosol consisting of micrometer-sized medication particles that are then inhaled.

Uses 

Metered-dose inhalers are only one type of inhaler, but they are the most commonly used type. The replacement of chlorofluorocarbons propellants with hydrofluoroalkanes (HFA) resulted in the redesign of metered-dose inhalers in the 1990s. For one variety of beclomethasone inhaler, this redesign resulted in considerably smaller aerosol particles being produced, and led to an increase of potency by a factor of 2.6.

Asthma inhalers contain a medication that treats the symptoms of asthma.
Nicotine inhalers allows cigarette smokers to get nicotine without using tobacco, much like nicotine gum or a nicotine patch. The US Food and Drug Administration (FDA) has approved some nicotine inhaler products for smoking cessation. Nicotine inhalers that are marketed as nicotine replacement therapy should not be confused with electronic cigarettes, which produce an aerosol, usually from a tobacco extract, using a heating coil, while nicotine inhalers produce a noncombusted nicotine aerosol. A study found that "levels of carcinogens and toxins in e-cigarettes typically exceeded those measured in an FDA-approved nicotine inhaler". Nicotine inhalers are also known by their nickname of “the puffer”. These devices are made of thin plastic, sometimes resembling a cigarette, or a cylinder shape. They contain a porous nicotine-filled plug, located in the base of the product. When you puff on the inhaler, nicotine aerosol is inhaled and absorbed in the mouth’s lining. Every inhaler delivers almost four hundred puffs of this nicotine vapor. The nicotine inhaler is also temperature sensitive. In cooler weather, less nicotine is delivered. The nicotine inhaler is considered easier to use than the electronic cigarette as it is usually disposable, and contains fewer parts than the electronic cigarette.
 Nicotine inhalers also exist as non-MDIs, for example, the format for the Nicorette Inhalator is an “inhalation vapour solution”.
Dry powder inhalers  involve micronised powder often packaged in single dose quantities in blisters or gel capsules containing the powdered medication to be drawn into the lungs by the user's own breath. These systems tend to be more expensive than the MDI, and patients with severely compromised lung function, such as occurs during an asthma attack, may find it difficult to generate enough airflow to get good function from them.
Metered-dose inhalers can be used to treat COPD, both in stable state and during lung attacks.

History 

Before the invention of the MDI, asthma medication was delivered using a squeeze bulb nebulizer which was fragile and unreliable.  The relatively crude nature of these devices also meant that the particles that they generated were relatively large, too large for effective drug delivery to the lungs.  Nonetheless these nebulizers paved the way for inhalation drug delivery providing the inspiration for the MDI.

MDIs were first developed in 1955 by Riker Laboratories, now a subsidiary of 3M Healthcare.  At that time MDIs represented a convergence of two relatively new technologies, the CFC propellant and the Meshburg metering valve which was originally designed for dispensing perfume. The initial design by Riker used a glass canister coated with a vinyl plastic to improve its resilience.  By 1956 Riker had developed two MDI based products, the Medihaler-Ept containing epinephrine and the Medihaler-Iso containing Isoprenaline.  Both products are agonists which provide short term relief from asthma symptoms and have now largely been replaced in asthma treatment by salbutamol, which is more selective.

Spacers 

Metered-dose inhalers are sometimes used with add-on devices referred to as holding chambers or spacers, which are tubes attached to the inhaler that act as a reservoir or holding chamber and reduce the speed at which the aerosol enters the mouth. They serve to hold the medication that is sprayed by the inhaler. This makes it easier to use the inhaler and helps ensure that more of the medication gets into the lungs instead of just into the mouth or the air. With proper use, a spacer can make an inhaler somewhat more effective in delivering medicine.

Spacers can be especially helpful to adults and children who find a regular metered dose inhaler hard to use. People who use corticosteroid inhalers should use a spacer to prevent getting the medicine in their mouth, where oral yeast infections and dysphonia can occur.

Lifespan and replacement 

The deposition of the content of drug formulation on the canister surface can result in a shorter shelf life of an MDI inhaler. Applying a suitable surface coating to the components helps to extend this shelf life. Over the years a range of coating processes have been developed that can be applied to both the canister and valve to protect the contents from deposition and degradation.
Gas plasma processing is an industrial technique that is carried out in a vacuum to coat the entire MDI inhaler and involves constant or pulsed excitation of gas by either Radio Frequency (RF) or microwave field to produce an energetic plasma. This coating ensures that the drug formulation does not stick to the interior wall of the MD inhaler and results in the patient receiving the prescribed dose of medication, whilst also extending the product's shelf-life.

A metered dose inhaler contains enough medication for a certain number of actuations (or "puffs") which is printed on the canister.  Even though the inhaler may continue to work beyond that number of uses, the amount of medication delivered may not be correct. It is important to keep track of the number of times an inhaler was used, so that it can be replaced after its recommended number of uses. For this reason, several regulatory authorities have requested that manufacturers add a dose counter or dose indicator to the actuator. Several inhalation products are now sold with a dose counter-actuator. Depending on the manufacturer and the product, inhalers are sold as a complete unit or the individual canister as a refill prescription.

Inhaler technique and use 
While MDIs are commonly used in the treatment of lung-based disorders, their use requires dexterity to complete the required sequential steps to achieve application of these devices.  Incorrect completion of one or more steps in the use of an MDI can substantially reduce the delivery of the administrated medication and consequently its effectiveness and safety. Numerous studies have demonstrated that between 50-100% of patients do not use their inhaler devices correctly, with patients often unaware that they are using their inhaled medication incorrectly. Incorrect inhaler technique has been associated with poorer outcomes. Incorrect maintenance and cleaning of metered dose inhalers is also an issue identified in many users, highlighting the need for clear guidance for patients prescribed MDIs.

Propellants 

One of the most crucial components of a MDI is its propellant. The propellant provides the force to generate the aerosol cloud and is also the medium in which the active component must be suspended or dissolved. Propellants in MDIs typically make up more than 99% of the delivered dose, so it is the properties of the propellant that dominate more than any other individual factor.  This is often overlooked in literature and in industry because so few propellants are used and their contribution is often taken for granted.  Suitable propellants must pass a stringent set of criteria, they must:
 have a boiling point in the range -100 to +30 °C 
 have a density of approximately 1.2 to 1.5 g cm−3 (approximately that of the drug to be suspended or dissolved)
 have a vapour pressure of 40 to 80 psig 
 have no toxicity to the patient 
 be non-flammable 
 be able to dissolve common additives (active ingredients should be either fully soluble or fully insoluble)

Chlorofluorocarbons (CFCs) 
In the early days of MDIs the most commonly used propellants were the chlorofluorocarbons CFC-11, CFC-12 and CFC-114.

In 2008 the Food and Drug Administration announced that inhalers using chlorofluorocarbons as a propellant, such as Primatene Mist, could no longer be manufactured or sold as of 2012. This followed from the U.S. decision to agree to the 1987 Montreal Protocol on Substances that deplete the ozone layer.

Hydrofluorocarbons 
CFC propellants have been replaced by hydrofluorocarbon propellants. Concerns about the use of hydrofluorocarbon propellants have however since arisen since these compounds are potent greenhouse gases; propellant released during the use of a single inhaler results in a greenhouse footprint equivalent to greenhouse gases released during a 180-mile car journey.

Surfactant lipids 
Phospholipids are important natural surfactant lipids  used in enhancing penetration and bioavailability. Phospholipids act by reducing the high surface tension forces at the air-water interface within the alveoli, thereby reducing the pressure needed to expand the lungs, Thus, commercially available formulations of phospholipids have been designed to spread rapidly over an air-aqueous interface, thereby reducing what is otherwise a very high surface tension of water.

Colours 
For ease of identification, many MDI's are colour-coded

Epinephrine in the United States is brown and beclometasone is light green

See also 
Inhaler
Dry powder inhaler
Asthma
Spray bottle

References

External links
 UpToDate Patient Information: Metered dose inhaler techniques in adults
 Using a metered-dose inhaler with a spacer: techniques for children, illustrated
 Using a metered-dose inhaler without a spacer: techniques for children, illustrated
 

Asthma
Drug delivery devices
Smoking cessation
Dosage forms